Garry Wills (born May 22, 1934) is an American author, journalist, political philosopher, and historian, specializing in American history, politics, and religion, especially the history of the Catholic Church. He won a Pulitzer Prize for General Non-Fiction in 1993.

Wills has written over fifty books and, since 1973, has been a frequent reviewer for The New York Review of Books. He became a faculty member of the history department at Northwestern University in 1980, where he is currently an Emeritus Professor of History.

Early years
Wills was born on May 22, 1934, in Atlanta, Georgia. His father, Jack Wills, was from a Protestant background, and his mother was from an Irish Catholic family. He was reared as Catholic and grew up in Michigan and Wisconsin, graduating in 1951 from Campion High School, a Jesuit institution in Prairie du Chien, Wisconsin. He entered and then left the Society of Jesus.

Wills earned a Bachelor of Arts degree from Saint Louis University in 1957 and a Master of Arts degree from Xavier University in 1958, both in philosophy. William F. Buckley Jr. hired him as a drama critic for National Review magazine at the age of 23. He received a Doctor of Philosophy degree in classics from Yale University in 1961. He taught history at Johns Hopkins University from 1962 to 1980, and is a fellow at the University of Edinburgh.

Personal life
Wills was married for sixty years (1959-2019) to Natalie Cavallo, a collaborator and photographer for his work as well as spouse. They have three children: John, Garry, and Lydia.

A trained classicist, Wills is proficient in Ancient Greek and Latin. His home in Evanston, Illinois, is "filled with books", with a converted bedroom dedicated to English literature, another containing Latin literature and books on American political thought, one hallway full of books on economics and religion, "including four shelves on St. Augustine", and another with shelves of Greek literature and philosophy.

Religion
Wills describes himself as a Roman Catholic and, with the exception of a period of doubt during his seminary years, has been a Roman Catholic all his life. He continues to attend Mass at the Sheil Catholic Center in Northwestern University. He prays the rosary every day, and wrote a book about the devotion (The Rosary: Prayer Comes Around) in 2005.

Wills has also been a critic of many aspects of church history and church teaching since at least the early 1960s. He has been particularly critical of the doctrine of papal infallibility; the social teaching of the church regarding homosexuality, abortion, contraception, and the Eucharist; and of the church's reaction to the sex abuse scandal.

In 1961, in a phone conversation with William F. Buckley Jr., Wills coined the famous macaronic phrase Mater si, magistra no (literally "mother yes, teacher no"). The phrase, which was a response to the papal encyclical Mater et magistra and a reference to the then-current anti-Castro slogan "Cuba sí, Castro no", signifies a devotion to the faith and tradition of the church, combined with a skeptical attitude towards ecclesiastical–church authority.

Wills published a full-length analysis of the contemporary Catholic Church, Bare Ruined Choirs, in 1972 and a full-scale criticism of the historical and contemporary church, Papal Sin: Structures of Deceit, in 2000. He followed up the latter with a sequel, Why I Am a Catholic (2002), as well as with the books What Jesus Meant (2006), What Paul Meant (2006), and What the Gospels Meant (2008).

Politics
Wills began his career as an early protégé of William F. Buckley Jr. and was associated with conservatism. When he first became involved with National Review he did not know if he was a conservative, calling himself a distributist. Later on, he was self-admittedly conservative, being regarded for a time as the "token conservative" for the National Catholic Reporter. In the early 1980s, after having supported more liberal positions for 20 years, he wrote a book titled Confessions of a Conservative, in which he described his break from William F. Buckley and the American conservative movement, while continuing to remain in some ways ethically and culturally conservative.

However, during the 1960s and 1970s, driven by his coverage of both civil rights and the anti-Vietnam War movements, Wills became increasingly liberal. His biography of president Richard M. Nixon, Nixon Agonistes (1970) landed him on the master list of Nixon political opponents. He supported Barack Obama in the 2008 presidential election, but declared two years later that Obama's presidency had been a "terrible disappointment".

In 1995, Wills wrote an article about the Second Amendment for The New York Review of Books. It was originally titled "Why We Have No Right to Bear Arms", but that was not Wills' conclusion. He neither wrote the title nor approved it prior to the article's publication. Instead, Wills argued that the Second Amendment refers to the right to keep and bear arms in a military context only, rather than justifying private ownership and use of guns. Furthermore, he said the military context did not entail the right of individuals to overthrow the government of the United States:

Public appraisal
The New York Times literary critic John Leonard said in 1970 that Wills "reads like a combination of H. L. Mencken, John Locke and Albert Camus." The Roman Catholic journalist John L. Allen Jr. considers Wills to be "perhaps the most distinguished Catholic intellectual in America over the last 50 years". Martin Gardner in "The Strange Case of Garry Wills" states there is a "mystery and strangeness that hovers like a gray fog over everything Wills has written about his faith".

Honors
 1978: Inventing America—National Book Critics Circle Award for General Non-Fiction (co-winner, with Facts of Life by Maureen Howard)
 1979: Inventing America—Merle Curti Award
 1982: Honorary degree of L.H.D. by the College of the Holy Cross
 1992: Lincoln at Gettysburg—National Book Critics Circle Award for Criticism
 1993: Lincoln at Gettysburg—Pulitzer Prize for General Non-Fiction
 1995: Honorary degree from Bates College
 1998: National Medal for the Humanities
 2001: The Lincoln Forum's Richard Nelson Current Award of Achievement
 2003: Inducted to the American Philosophical Society
 2004: St. Louis Literary Award from the Saint Louis University Library Associates
 Inducted as a Laureate of The Lincoln Academy of Illinois and awarded the Order of Lincoln (the State's highest honor) by the Governor of Illinois in 2006 in the area of Communication and Education.

Works

Chesterton: Man and Mask, Doubleday, 1961. 
Animals of the Bible (1962)
Politics and Catholic Freedom (1964)
Roman Culture: Weapons and the Man (1966), 
The Second Civil War: Arming for Armageddon (1968)
Jack Ruby (1968), 
Nixon Agonistes: The Crisis of the Self-made Man (1970, 1979), 
Bare Ruined Choirs: Doubt, Prophecy, and Radical Religion (1972), 
Values Americans Live By (1973), 
Inventing America: Jefferson's Declaration of Independence (1978), 
Confessions of a Conservative (1979), 
At Button's (1979), 
Explaining America: The Federalist (1981), 
The Kennedy Imprisonment: A Meditation on Power (1982), 
Lead Time: A Journalist's Education (1983), 
Cincinnatus: George Washington and the Enlightenment (1984), 
Reagan's America: Innocents at Home (1987), 
Under God: Religion and American Politics (1990), 
Lincoln at Gettysburg: The Words That Remade America (1992), 
Certain Trumpets: The Call of Leaders (1994), 
Witches and Jesuits: Shakespeare's Macbeth (1995), 
John Wayne's America: The Politics of Celebrity (1997), 
Saint Augustine (1999), 
Saint Augustine's Childhood (2001), 
Saint Augustine's Memory (2002), 
Saint Augustine's Sin (2003), 
Saint Augustine's Conversion (2004), 
A Necessary Evil: A History of American Distrust of Government (1999), 
Papal Sin: Structures of Deceit (2000), 
Venice: Lion City: The Religion of Empire (2001), 
Why I Am a Catholic (2002), 
Mr. Jefferson's University (2002), 
James Madison (2002), 
Negro President: Jefferson and the Slave Power (2003), 
Henry Adams and the Making of America (2005), 
The Rosary: Prayer Comes Round (2005), 
What Jesus Meant (2006), 
What Paul Meant (2006), 
Bush's Fringe Government (2006), 
Head and Heart: American Christianities (2007), 
What the Gospels Meant (2008), 
Bomb Power (2010), 
Outside Looking In: Adventures of an Observer (2010), 
Augustine's 'Confessions': A Biography (2011), 
Verdi's Shakespeare: Men of the Theater (2011), 
Rome and Rhetoric: Shakespeare's Julius Caesar (2011), 
Font of Life: Ambrose, Augustine, and the Mystery of Baptism (2012), 
Why Priests? (2013), 
Making Make-Believe Real: Politics as Theater in Shakespeare's Time (2014) 
The Future of the Catholic Church with Pope Francis (March 2015), 
What The Qur'an Meant and Why It Matters (2017),

References

Further reading
Perlstein, Rick, "The American Atom", Bookforum: Rick Perlstein talks to Garry Wills about "The Bomb".
Delbanco, Andrew, "The Right-Wing Christians", New York Review of Books, Review of Wills's Head and Heart: American Christianities.
New York Times, "Featured Author" page.
New York Times, Index of articles about Garry Wills, (covers 1983 to 2008).
Northwestern University, History Faculty of NW university
Wills at San Francisco's Grace Cathedral, a live conversation with Dean Alan Jones (archived)
Wills, Garry, October 13, 2007, Lecture at Politics and Prose bookstore in Washington, D.C. to promote his book, Head and Heart.

External links

Booknotes interview with Wills on Under God: Religion and American Politics, December 30, 1990.
In Depth interview with Wills, January 2, 2005

1934 births
Living people
20th-century American biographers
20th-century American historians
21st-century American biographers
21st-century American historians
21st-century American male writers
Former Jesuits
20th-century American Jesuits
American male non-fiction writers
American political writers
The Atlantic (magazine) people
Catholics from Illinois
Critics of the Catholic Church
Historians of the Catholic Church
Members of the American Academy of Arts and Letters
National Humanities Medal recipients
National Review people
Northwestern University faculty
Pulitzer Prize for General Non-Fiction winners
Roman Catholic dissidents
Saint Louis University alumni
Writers from Atlanta
Writers from Evanston, Illinois
Xavier University alumni
Yale Graduate School of Arts and Sciences alumni
Academics of the University of Edinburgh
Members of the American Philosophical Society